Wild and Lonely is the fourth studio album by Scottish act the Associates. The album was released on 24 March 1990 by AVL/Virgin subsidiary Circa Records, a label Mackenzie had signed to after WEA/Warner rejected the fourth Associates album The Glamour Chase (with only Mackenzie's cover of Blondie's "Heart of Glass" emerging from this album while under contract to WEA, when it was released as a single and put on the Vaultage From The Electric Lighting Station compilation). Wild and Lonely was produced by Australian record producer Julian Mendelsohn, it peaked at No. 71 on the UK Albums Chart. Three singles were released from the album: "Fever", "Fire to Ice" and "Just Can't Say Goodbye", all of which failed to chart in the UK Top 40, peaking at numbers 81, 92 and 79 respectively.

Critical reception

Wild and Lonely was poorly received by critics.

Ira Robbins, writing for Entertainment Weekly, wrote "Scotland's Associates have ended a lengthy recording hiatus with a glossy, shallow album that sounds seriously out of step. Where most high-tech dance-pop now follows the soothing groove of Soul II Soul, the Associates — more precisely, singer-songwriter Billy Mackenzie plus a load of session players — cling to a dramatic delivery and chattering, generally overloaded arrangements." In a retrospective review for AllMusic, critic Ned Raggett wrote, "There's some of the same relative musical ennui, where everything is perfectly pleasant but rarely striking. Even more distressing, more than once, said music is little more than late-'80s glossy yup-funk that is singularly unappealing in its boredom, often saved only by Mackenzie's performing bravura and nice production touches [...] Happily, the worse moments don't define the album, and when at its best, Wild and Lonely serves up a fine selection of new Mackenzie classics."

Track listing

Personnel
Credits are adapted from the Wild and Lonely liner notes.

Musicians
Billy Mackenzie – vocals
Blair Booth – keyboards, strings, programming, vocals
Philipp Erb – keyboards, strings, programming
Gary Maughan – keyboards, programming
L. Howard Hughes – piano, strings
Mimi Izumi Kobayashi – piano
Chester Kamen – guitar
J.J. Belle – guitar
Mark Rutherford – guitar
Guy Pratt – bass guitar
Kevin Hutchison – bass guitar
Danny Cummings – percussion
Moritz von Oswald – percussion
Malcolm Duncan – saxophone
Neil Sidwell – saxophone
Martin Drover – trumpet
Lennie Costa – bouzouki
Anne Dudley – strings
Gavyn Wright – strings
Carol Kenyon – backing vocals
 Carroll Thompson – backing vocals
 Juliet Roberts – backing vocals

Production and artwork
Julian Mendelsohn – producer
Billy Mackenzie – producer, sleeve design
Ren Swan - engineer
Richard Haughton – photography
Colin Williams – painting

Charts

References

External links
 

The Associates (band) albums
1990 albums
Albums produced by Julian Mendelsohn